Liopasia andrealis is a moth in the family Crambidae. It was described by Paul Dognin in 1910. It is found in Venezuela and Brazil (Mato Grosso).

References

Moths described in 1910
Spilomelinae